is a Japanese anime and an alternate version of Di Gi Charat. The series features Dejiko, and Puchiko, two catgirls who travel to Earth, for princess training, where they are accidentally split up.

104 12-minute episodes were produced by Madhouse and aired as fifty-two episodes between April 6, 2003 and March 28, 2004 on TV Tokyo. Hiroaki Sakurai, director of the original series, returned as the director. Di Gi Charat Nyo! was licensed by Bandai Entertainment in North America.

Plot
Di Gi Charat, or Dejiko for short, is the princess of planet Di Gi Charat. Her lazy behaviour is troublesome for her servants and tutors as she "eye-beams" them as they lecture her. In order to get Dejiko to become a good princess, her mother sends her on a trip to earth for princess training. To prevent Dejiko from coming back too early, her mother only fills their spaceship with enough fuel for a one way trip. On earth, Dejiko stays with Kiyoshi and Yasushi Omocha in their toy shop, while Puchiko stays at the Ankorodo Cake Shop.

Concepts

Dejiko and Puchiko have cell phones called Mystery Phones which they can communicate with other. In Piyoko's debut episode, she wants one and finally gets it in the Christmas episode as a gift from Dejiko.

Started on episode 78 (39 2nd title), there is a "princess school" where the main characters have classes, and Dejiko's mother is the principal. There is also a cheerleader club led by Usada. Teachers are Usada Akari, Subarashī-nin (Abarenbō), Kareida, and Yurei's Bāya.

Characters

Dejiko (でじこ)
Real name: Di Gi Charat (デ・ジ・キャラット De Ji Kyaratto)
Age: 10
Suffix: nyo (にょ)
Special ability: Eye Beam (目からビーム Me kara Bīmu)

Dejiko is the Royal Princess of Planet Di Gi Charat. (She is also known as Di Gi Charat or Chocola / Chocolat). She was sent to Earth for Princess Training. She's characteristically lazy and stays at "Super Omo-chan" Toy Store.

Puchiko (ぷちこ)
Real name: Petit Charat (プチ・キャラット Puchi Kyaratto) / Tiger Charat
Age: 5
Suffix: nyu (にゅ)
Special ability: Eye Beam in training (トレーニングに目からビーム Torēningu ni Me kara Bīmu)

Puchiko is Dejiko's assistant. (Also known as Petit Charat or Cappuchino). A tiger girl, She also came to Earth for Princess Training and stays at "Ankorodo" confectionist. She is usually quiet, but sharp-tongued.

Rabi~en~Rose (ラ・ビ・アン・ローズ Ra-bi-an-Rōzu) / La Vie en Rose
Real name: Hikaru Usada (ヒカルうさだ)
Age: 14
Special Ability: Rabbit Ears Proppela (ウサ耳プロペラ Usa Mimi Puropera)

Hikaru is a 14-year-old junior student, she has a bit of a crush on Omocha Kiyoshi. She transforms into Rabi~En~Rose but in reality she just changes clothes in a big box with rabbit ears that she carries around. She wants to be a famous idol like Akari. She lives at "Charisma" which is her father's beauty salon. She spends time giving away tissues on the street to promote the beauty salon and to train as a future idol. Her name is most probably a parody of the Japanese singer, Hikaru Utada.

Gema (ゲマ)
Suffix: gema (げま)

Gema is a floating yellow ball who looks after Dejiko. He is always being attacked by Dejiko's Eye-Beam, sometimes just for annoying her.

Dejiko's friends
Akari Usada (あかりうさだ)
Age: 17

Akari is a very famous idol and Hikaru's cousin. She's very nice and likeable. She becomes a teacher at the Princess School in the second season of the series but doesn't teach much because of her busy schedule.

Chibi Akari (ちびあかり)
Age: 8

Chibi Akari is a girl who was trained to be the imposter of Akari Usada.

Rinna Charat (リンナ・キャラット Rinna Kyaratto)
Age: 10
Suffix: myu (みゅ)

Rinna is not related to Dejiko or Puchiko but is from their planet. She is good at cooking, but falls asleep easily. Not an original Di Gi Charat character, instead she originated from "Panyo Panyo Di Gi Charat". Alternative names: Linna, Lina, Rina.

Mike Charat (ミ・ケ・キャラット Mi Ke Kyaratto)
Age: 10
Suffix: mya (みゃ)

Mike is not related with Puchiko or Dejiko, but is from their planet. She is good at fishing and is constantly looking for the "legendary fishing rod". Not an original Di Gi Charat character, instead she originated from "Panyo Panyo Di Gi Charat". Alternative names: Mi Ke (pronunciate MEE-ké), Meek.

Yu-Rei (幽霊 Yūrei)
Age: 10

Yu-Rei is a scary girl who lives in a haunted house. Everyone is a little afraid of her, and she feels very insulted by this. To make matters worse, she is allergic to the sun, which forces her to use a protective suit that looks like a ghost costume when she is outdoors. Yu-Rei has a very scary face that she sometimes uses. Her name is a homophone for the Japanese word for ghost.

Aqua (アクア Akua)
Age: Over 120

Aqua is a mermaid that Dejiko caught while she was fishing. She's pretty and very nice, but very old, and can probably live forever. She can't walk on land, so she travels around on a skateboard. She has an ability to become bigger.

Black Gema Gema Gang
Piyoko (ぴよこ)
Real name: Pyocola Analogue III (ピョコラ=アナローグIII世 Pyokora-Anarōgu San-sei)
Age: 8
Suffix: pyo (ぴょ)
Special ability: Mouth Bazooka (口からバズーカ Kuchi kara Bazūka)

Piyoko is from Planet Analogue, Dejiko's rival planet, and came to earth to kidnap Dejiko. She is very poor and often eats only herbs from around her spaceship. She is watched over by Coo, Ky, and Rik; together they call themselves the Black Gema Gema Dan (Gang).

Rik Heisenberg (リク=ハイゼンベルク Riku-Haizenberuku)
Age: 26

Part of the Black Gema Gema Gang. He is a Veterinarian and loves animals. He acts as Piyoko's father.

Ky Schweitzer (カイ=シュヴァイツァー Kai-Shuvaitsā)
Age: 17

Part of the Black Gema Gema Gang. He is a dentist, and usually helps people with their teeth. He acts as Piyoko's mother.

Coo Erhard (クウ=エアハルト Kuu-Eaharuto)
Age: 13

Part of the Black Gema Gema Gang. He is a doctor, but that doesn't matter much. Coo has a crush on Piyoko. He acts as Piyoko's pet.

Lucky Cat (Maneki Neko) Shopping District residents
Yasushi Omocha (やすし面茶)
Age: 24

The owner of "Super Omo-chan" the toy store where Dejiko stays on earth. He is always building useless toys that often destroy parts of the store. He has a particular obsession with Puchiko.

Kiyoshi Omocha (きよし面茶)
Age: 14

Yasushi's brother. He goes to the same school as Hikaru—Bobo Junior High School (ボーボー中学 Bōbō Chūgaku).

Daifuku Ankoro (大福庵衣)

Owner of Ankorodo, the traditional Japanese style bakery where Puchiko stays at on Earth. He is a master player of the "magic string". He is very competitive competing against Gema using the string and against Rinna to find who the best baker is. (Rinna falls asleep and forgets about the competition).

Kinako Ankoro (きなこ庵衣)

Daifuku's wife, she is a very calm person and often enjoys a cup of tea while everyone else is fighting. She is very skilled at juggling. Loves Puchiko as if she were her granddaughter, she is often worrying about her whereabouts.

Michelle Usada (ミッシェルうさだ Misheru Usada)

Hikaru's father. He has a nose mustache and working clothes. He had gained a reputation as a big spender considerably. Although it was a long time ago, in the Lucky Cat Shopping District which is pedestrian paradise. He has good sense with it, such as pushing a motorbike and walking.

Françoise Usada (フランソワうさだ Furansowa Usada)

Hikaru's mother. A slightly excessive fashion designer. She has a little provincial accent by the half of Japanese and French descendant. She is the wife of Michelle and she had gained a reputation as a big spender considerably in a similar manner a long time ago.

Hokke Mirin (ほっけみりん)
Hokke Mirin is a female cat whom Puchiko is taking care of. Living at Manmaru Shrine, Hokke Mirin has five kittens named: Sa (さ), Shi (し), Su (す), Se (せ) and So (そ). The father of the kittens is the translucent cat Jelly Joe (ゼリー・ジョー Zerī-Jō).

Majin Gappa (まじんがっぱ)
Majin Gappa is a kappa whom Rabi~en~Rose is taking care of. He lives in the pond of the Manmaru Shrine. His special abilities are tricks with water.

Di Gi Charat Planet
Di Gi Charat Mama (デ・ジ・キャラットママ De Ji Kyaratto Mama)

She is the mother of Dejiko and she is the Queen of Di Gi Charat Planet. She won't talk too much with Dejiko that make Dejiko will go home and become good princess faster.

Di Gi Charat Papa (デ・ジ・キャラットパパ De Ji Kyaratto Papa)
He is the father of Dejiko and he is the King of Di Gi Charat Planet. His face is not shown without knowing why. The Queen was touched off by having acted as the principal at the Princess School. He asked Yasushi, and made the Prince School open. Of course, the principal is the King. To Dejiko, it is sweet and feels indebted to a Queen.

Hitsu-G (ひつ・ジー Hitsu-Jī)

He is a worker from Di Gi Charat Castle. He is sheep-man and more like stay in Princess School.

Victoria Elizabeth (ビクトリア・エリザベス Bikutoria Erizabesu)

She is a worker from Di Gi Charat Castle. She more active in Di Gi Charat Castle than in Princess School.

Music
The opening theme "Heartbeat" is a translation to Japanese of the Swedish entry to the Eurovision Song Contest 2001 Listen to Your Heartbeat. The ending theme "Equal Romance" is a cover version of the same song by CoCo, which was the second ending theme of Ranma .

Opening
 "Heartbeat" by Prière
 "Dynamite I.N.G (ダイナマイト★Ｉ・Ｎ・Ｇ)" by Asami Sanada, Miyuki Sawashiro, and Kyoko Hikami
 "Miracle Wonderland (ミラクル☆ワンダーランド)" by Asami Sanada, Miyuki Sawashiro, and Kyoko Hikami
Ending
 "Equal Romance" by Prière
 "Di Gi Charat Ondo (デ・ジ・キャラット音頭)" by Asami Sanada, Miyuki Sawashiro, Kyoko Hikami, and Yoshiko Kamei
 "PARTY☆NIGHT -Cyber Trance Version-" by Asami Sanada, Miyuki Sawashiro, Kyoko Hikami, and Yuka Iguchi
 "PARTY☆NIGHT -Cyber X'mas Version-" by Asami Sanada, Miyuki Sawashiro, Kyoko Hikami, and Yuka Iguchi
 "Daisuki (ダイスキ)" by Asami Sanada, Miyuki Sawashiro, and Kyoko Hikami

Licensing
Bandai Entertainment released nine volumes, each of them containing eight episodes. So far, 72 episodes have been dubbed.

External links
 

2003 anime television series debuts
Absurdist fiction
Bandai Entertainment anime titles
Comedy anime and manga
Di Gi Charat
Kemonomimi
Madhouse (company)
Science fiction anime and manga
Takara Tomy
TV Tokyo original programming